Charles A. Jenkins (born December 18, 1962) is a former member of the Maryland House of Delegates representing Maryland District 3B, which covered Frederick and Washington County, Maryland.  He was appointed by Governor Martin O'Malley to fill the vacancy created by Richard B. Weldon Jr.'s resignation.

Prior to being appointed to the Maryland House of Delegates, Charles Jenkins was a member of the Board of County Commissioners in  Frederick County, Maryland, a position he held since December 2006.  In this position he was the board liaison to the Commission on Aging of Frederick County, the Frederick Municipal Airport Commission, the Frederick County Volunteer Fire Department, the Frederick Area Committee for Transportation, and the Metropolitan Washington Council of Governments where he served as the Chairman of the Transportation Planning Board from 2009 to 2010.

In addition to his position on the Board of County Commissioners, Jenkins was also the chair of the National Capital Region Transportation Planning Board from 2008 until 2010.  From 1983 until 1987 he was a member of the United States Navy serving as a cryptologist.  During his service in the military he received the Navy Achievement Medal and the Joint Services Achievement Medal.

From 2003 to 2011, Delegate Jenkins was a realtor for Re/Max. Since January 2011, Delegate Jenkins has been the owner/broker of Envest Realty Group, LLC. in Middletown, MD. In 2018 he began All American Signs, a real estate service company installing sign posts & panels for Central Maryland Realtors.

Education
Delegate Jenkins graduated from James Madison University in 1990 with a bachelor's degree in Russian Language.

In the legislature
To see a list of bills sponsored and co-sponsored by Delegate Jenkins:

Delegate Jenkins' Sponsored and Co-Sponsored Legislation

References

External links
 Maryland Archives

County commissioners in Maryland
Republican Party members of the Maryland House of Delegates
Living people
James Madison University alumni
Politicians from Norfolk, Virginia
1962 births
21st-century American politicians